In geometry, the truncated order-6 hexagonal tiling is a uniform tiling of the hyperbolic plane. It has Schläfli symbol of t{6,6}. It can also be identically constructed as a cantic order-6 square tiling, h2{4,6}

Uniform colorings 
By *663 symmetry, this tiling can be constructed as an omnitruncation, t{(6,6,3)}:

Symmetry 

The dual to this tiling represent the fundamental domains of [(6,6,3)] (*663) symmetry. There are 3 small index subgroup symmetries constructed from [(6,6,3)] by mirror removal and alternation. In these images fundamental domains are alternately colored black and white, and mirrors exist on the boundaries between colors. 

The symmetry can be doubled as 662 symmetry by adding a mirror bisecting the fundamental domain.

Related polyhedra and tiling

References
 John H. Conway, Heidi Burgiel, Chaim Goodman-Strass, The Symmetries of Things 2008,  (Chapter 19, The Hyperbolic Archimedean Tessellations)

See also
Square tiling
Tilings of regular polygons
List of uniform planar tilings
List of regular polytopes

External links 

 Hyperbolic and Spherical Tiling Gallery
 KaleidoTile 3: Educational software to create spherical, planar and hyperbolic tilings
 Hyperbolic Planar Tessellations, Don Hatch

Hexagonal tilings
Hyperbolic tilings
Isogonal tilings
Order-6 tilings
Truncated tilings
Uniform tilings